Gignac-la-Nerthe is a commune in the Bouches-du-Rhône department in southern France. It is located about 10 km north-north-west of Marseille and is primarily a residential community.

History 
During Antiquity, what is now Gignac hosted a Roman villa.

In the 13th century, the Knights Templar built the Saint-Michel de Gignac castle. After the Middle Age, agriculture developed (wheat, olive, vineries,…). The church of Gignac was built in 1780. At that time, Gignac was part of the Marignane seigneurie.

The commune was created during the French Revolution. At first, it included Le Rove, which separated in 1835. In 1919, the commune changed its name from Gignac to Gignac-la-Nerthe to differentiate from other towns with the same name.

In the 19th century, many migrants from Spain and Italy came to live in the area, but the town only started to grow in the 1960s with the arrival of Pieds-Noirs from Algeria.

Geography and population 
Gignac-la-Nerthe is situated just north of the Estaque hills and south of the Étang de Berre.

See also
Communes of the Bouches-du-Rhône department

References

Communes of Bouches-du-Rhône
Bouches-du-Rhône communes articles needing translation from French Wikipedia